Jamie White (born 1968) is an American radio personality and actress.

Jamie White may also refer to:
Jamie White (footballer) (born 1989), English footballer
Jay White (born 1992), New Zealand-Dutch professional wrestler

See also
Jayme White, American diplomat